Kalateh-ye Seyyed Ali (also Romanized as Kalāteh-ye Seyyed ‘Alī and Kalāteh Saiyid ‘Ali; also known as Sa‘īdābād and Seyyed ‘Alī) is a village in Neh Rural District, in the Central District of Nehbandan County, South Khorasan Province, Iran. At the 2006 census, its population was 336, in 96 families.

References 

Populated places in Nehbandan County